This Is Barbara Mandrell is the fourth solo studio album by American country music singer Barbara Mandrell, released in May 1976.

This was Mandrell's first album with ABC/Dot Records, her new record company. Mandrell had previously been signed to Columbia Records from 1969 to 1974, though only achieving modest success, especially with her albums. The first single off this album, "Standing Room Only", became her first Top 5 Country hit. Mandrell had only had four Top 10 hits under her previous record company over the course of five years. Following "Standing Room Only", two further singles were released. The second, "That's What Friends Are For", peaked at #16 and the third, "Love Is Thin Ice", only reached the Top 25. The album sold slightly better than her previous albums had done, peaking farther on the Top Country Albums chart at #26. This album set the stage for Mandrell's eventual success in the following decade, with further Top 10 singles, some of them reaching #1. Unlike most of Barbara's other albums, This Is Barbara Mandrell, consists of 11 tracks instead of 10.

Track listing
"That's What Friends Are For" (Ed Penney, Robert Shaw Parsons)
"Standing Room Only" (Charles Silver, Susan Manchester)
"The Beginning of the End" (Kent Robbins)
"Husband Stealer" (Gary Paxton, Gary Paxton, Jr.)
"She Don't Have to Stop and Rock the Baby" (Danny Hice, Ruby Hice)
"Love the Second Time Around" (John Schweers)
"Love Is Thin Ice" (Geoffrey Morgan)
"Can't Help But Wonder" (Sharon Sanders)
"Will We Ever Make Love in Love Again" (Bud Reneau, Sarah Jones)
"Mental Revenge" (Mel Tillis)
"Just in Case" (Hugh Moffatt)

Personnel
Barbara Mandrell - lead vocals
Mike Leech, Steve Schaffer - bass guitar
Hayward Bishop, Larrie Londin, Kenny Malone - drums
Jim Buchanan, Johnny Gimble, Tommy Williams - fiddle
Harold Bradley, Jimmy Capps, Steve Gibson, Glenn Keener, Grady Martin, Billy Sanford, Jerry Shook, Chip Young - guitar
Charlie McCoy - harmonica
David Briggs, Ron Oates, Bobby Ogdin, Hargus "Pig" Robbins - piano
John Hughey, Hal Rugg - steel guitar
Joe Zinkan - upright bass
Charlie McCoy, Farrell Morris - vibraphone
Lea Jane Berinati, Janie Fricke, Herman Harper, The Jordanaires, The Nashville Edition, D. Bergen White - backing vocals
Archie Jordan - string arrangements (tracks 1,3,5,6)

Charts
Album – Billboard (North America)

Singles – Billboard (North America)

References

1976 albums
Barbara Mandrell albums
Albums produced by Tom Collins (record producer)
Dot Records albums